Sweet Sleep  is a Soviet and Russian music group, popular in the 1990s. Its most popular songs are "Black Thunderstorm" and "Night February".

History
At the end of 1989, producer Vladimir Maslov organized the pop group The Bright Path. Its soloist was unknown to Aleksei Svetlichny. They released Magneto, an album with 6-7 songs. The other participants were Oleg Khromov and Sergei Vasyuta.

The group then broke up. In 1991 Khromov and Vasyuta each released their own albums. On both albums there are songs "White Cover of January" and "Night February".

The authorship of many of their compositions is disputed by the musicians. Most sources who tell about the group since 1992 to the present day are based on data from Vasyuta, who is currently the owner of the Sweet Sleep trademark and claims authorship of most of the group's songs.

The first album was reissued by Oleg Khromov as a solo. Songs from it were performed by multiple musical collectives and individual soloists (including Razin, Svetlichny, Maslov, Samoshin and others).

In 1992, Barefoot Girl was released. At that time, the soloist was Vasyuta. In album releases, he is listed as the author of the songs.

In the  middle 1990s, Maslov made an attempt to create a group with the same name. They released two albums with the vocals of Samoshin and Ruslan Maslov (Vladimir's son). Vasyuta took Maslov to court and won the case; the next album of Maslov-Samoshin team did not mention Sweet Sleep.

Vasyuta continues to promote the group. He releases albums and tours. Sweet Sleep appears on television. Most of the time, Vasyuta performs in Germany. In Russia he performs at corporate festivals with 1980's stars.

In October 2000, Vasyuta was reportedly unable to tour and was looking for a performance double.

References

External links
 Official site
 Официальный сайт Сергея Васюты
 Дискотека СССР

Musical groups established in 1989
Soviet pop music groups
Russian pop music groups